Gordon Arthur Haaland (April 19, 1940 – October 23, 2017) was an American academic. He was the fifteenth President of the University of New Hampshire from 1984 to 1990, and of Gettysburg College from 1990 to 2004. He was an alumnus of Wheaton College  and the State University of New York at Buffalo, earning a doctorate degree in social psychology at the latter.

Haaland oversaw the establishment of the Institute for the Study of Earth, Oceans, and Space, which dramatically increased research funding to the university.

University of New Hampshire built a residence hall named SERC Hall C In 2007, on October 11, 2013, this hall was renamed to Haaland Hall in his honor.

References

External Links
University of New Hampshire: Office of the President
Full list of University Presidents (including interim Presidents) , University of New Hampshire Library
"Guide to the Gordon A. Haaland Papers, 1983-1990", University of New Hampshire Library
Institute for the Study of Earth, Oceans, and Space

1940 births
2017 deaths
Presidents of the University of New Hampshire
Wheaton College (Illinois) alumni
University at Buffalo alumni
Presidents of Gettysburg College
People from Brooklyn